Code: Version 2.0 is a 2006 book by Harvard law professor Lawrence Lessig which proposes that governments have broad regulatory powers over the Internet. The book is released under a Creative Commons license, CC BY-SA 2.5.

The book 

The book is an update to Lessig's book Code and Other Laws of Cyberspace, which was written in response and opposition to the notion that state governments could not regulate cyberspace and the Internet.  The original argument that Lessig took issue with was weakened in the years following the book's release, as it became widely acknowledged that government regulation of the Internet was imminent, and so the author thought it necessary to update the work. Lessig acknowledges that there are those who continue to disagree with his viewpoint, but adamantly maintains that the Internet will increasingly evolve in a more regulable direction.

Dedication

The book is dedicated to Wikipedia with the words:

Collaboratively writing the book 

Code: Version 2.0 was developed by Lessig and a group of Stanford Law School students with the help of the Jotspot Code V2 wiki.

See also
 Free Culture

References

External links 
 Code: Version 2.0 Download
 Book review

2006 non-fiction books
Books by Lawrence Lessig
Creative Commons-licensed books
Books about the Internet